Juluka was a South African band formed by Johnny Clegg and Sipho Mchunu.  means "sweat" in Zulu, and was the name of a bull owned by Mchunu. The band was closely associated with the mass movement against apartheid.

History
At the age of 14, Clegg met Zulu street musician Charlie Mzila, who taught him Zulu music and dancing over the following two years. In 1969 Johnny Clegg and Sipho Mchunu met in Johannesburg when young sipho went there to find work. The 18-year-old Mchunu challenged the 16-year-old Clegg to a guitar contest, and the two became friends. Soon, they were performing together on the streets and in what few other unofficial venues a multi-racial band could safely play in under apartheid. They were forced to keep a low profile and their success came from word of mouth instead of through traditional publicity. Clegg himself was arrested and beaten up by the police on several occasions for his activities and also for the band's lyrics. For some commentators, Juluka was the band that had the greatest success in challenging the racial separateness of Apartheid. When performing, both black and white band members would appear on stage in traditional Zulu dress and perform the traditional Zulu war dance together while singing in Zulu and English.

In 1976, Clegg and Mnchunu  released their debut single, "Woza Friday" as Johnny & Sipho, followed three years later by the debut Juluka album, the critically acclaimed Universal Men. The album's poetic lyrics were strongly influenced by John Berger's A Seventh Man as well as Pablo Neruda and Jean-Paul Sartre. Expanding to a quintet, they released a second album, African Litany, in late 1981. The album's lead single, "Impi", with its pointedly political lyrics about a defeat of the colonial British army by the Zulus at the Battle of Isandlwana, was banned by South African radio but became an underground hit. In contemporary South Africa it is often associated with national sports teams. The album garnered them their first international attention, and they were able to successfully tour in Europe and North America in 1982 and 1983. However, in June 1983, the British music magazine, NME, reported that they were initially banned by the Musicians Union as, ..."since it would not be possible to approve one of our bands working in South Africa, there is no possibility of an exchange".  The ban was eventually lifted, with the group donating their fees to charity.

In South Africa, Juluka was also banned by Radio Bantu, a government approved radio station for the black population, which allegedly refused to play Juluka's music, because Clegg's efforts were seen as "an insult to the Zulu and their culture".

The group disbanded in 1985 when Mchunu moved back to the farm where he was born in Natal to take care of his family. Clegg went on to form a new band, Savuka, with whom he achieved even greater international success. In 1997, however, the two friends came back for a final album together. It did not receive the critical acclaim of early Juluka albums like Universal Men, African Litany, Work for All and Scatterlings.

Music 
The styles incorporated into Juluka's music are maskanda and mbaqanga, both of which are native to South Africa, and western folk and rock. The band employed various instruments besides the guitar and traditional Zulu instruments, such as the saxophone and, later, synthesizers. Ngoma dancing featured in some of their later songs. 

Juluka's music undermined the stereotypic correlations of 'traditional' and 'primitive' on the one hand, and 'Western' and 'civilised' on the other. The band accomplished this through sophisticated blendings of musical elements that evoked 'Western' and Zulu culture in their songs' harmonies, rhythms, forms, and more.

Lyrics 
While they were often written in metaphor, many of the band's lyrics were undeniably political. In Universal Man for example, Mchunu and Clegg describe a bull fight in which the small bull beats the big bull not by force but by skill, symbolising the victory of the underdog over his oppressor.

In keeping with their fashioning a sound out of both African and European musical traditions, Clegg's lyrics also contributed to Juluka's impact, exploring what it meant for Clegg as a white person to be African. As he explained in an interview: ‘the issue of being a white African and finding a place for European culture in a base of African music was an important aspect of what I was doing.’

Discography

Albums
Studio
1979: Universal Men
1981: African Litany
1982: Ubuhle Bemvelo
1982: Scatterlings
1983: Work For All
1984: Stand Your Ground
1984: Musa Ukungilandela
1997: Crocodile Love (released in South Africa as Ya Vuka Inkunzi)

Live
1986: The Good Hope Concerts

Compilation
1984: The International Tracks 
1988: Le Rock Zoulou de Johnny Clegg & Sipho (consisting of most of the tracks from Ubuhle Bemvelo and Musa Ukungilandela)
2006: Heart of the Dancer

Singles and EPs
1976: "Woza Friday" (debut single)
1981: "Impi"
1982: "Scatterlings of Africa" - AUS #93
1982: "Umbaqanga Music"
1982: "African Ideas"
1984: "Fever"
1984: "Ibhola Lethu"
1997: "Love Is Just a Dream (Tatazela) (Juluka / Johnny Clegg & Sipho Mchunu)

Members
 Johnny Clegg – vocals, guitar (1969–1985, 1997; died 2019)
 Sipho Mchunu – guitar, percussion, vocals (1969–1985, 1997)
 Johnny Boshoff – bass guitar, percussion, vocals (1981–1982)
 Derek de Beer – drums, percussion, vocals (1981–1982, 1984–1985)
 Robbie Jansen – flute, saxophone, vocals (1981–1982; died 2010)
 Zola Mtiya – drums, percussion, vocals (1982–1984)
 Gary Van Zyl – bass guitar, percussion, vocals (1982–1985)
 Tim Hoare – keyboards, vocals (1982–1984)
 Scorpion Madondo – flute, saxophone, vocals (1982–1985; died 2010)
 Glenda Millar – keyboards, vocals (1983 – 1984)
 Cyril Mnculwane – keyboards, vocals (1984–1985; died 2019)

References

External links
 Juluka discography at discogs
 

South African musical groups
Warner Records artists
Musical groups established in 1969